William Mundell was a Democratic candidate for the Arizona Corporation Commission in the 2016 election.

Mundell served on the commission from 1999 until 2009 as a Republican. Mundell served in the Arizona House of Representatives from 1986 to 1992, also as a Republican.

References

External links
Ballotpedia

Year of birth missing (living people)
Living people
Arizona Democrats
Arizona Republicans